Berava may refer to:

 Berava (people), a social group or caste in Sri Lanka
 Berava (river), a river in eastern Croatia
 Berava, Iran, a village in West Azerbaijan Province, Iran